The Sword is an American heavy metal band formed in Austin, Texas in 2003. The band released its debut album Age of Winters in 2006; the songs on the album were largely written by frontman J. D. Cronise before the band's formation, although the musical compositions were credited to the band as a whole. In 2007 the band contributed the track "Sea of Spears" to a split extended play (EP) with Swedish band Witchcraft, which was credited to Cronise and guitarist Kyle Shutt, as well as a cover version of Led Zeppelin's "Immigrant Song". In 2008 the band released its second album Gods of the Earth, which was again credited to Cronise (lyrics) and the band as a whole (music), as well as the single "Fire Lances of the Ancient Hyperzephyrians" which featured the previously unreleased track "Codex Corvidae" as the B-side.

After contributing a cover version of Thin Lizzy's "Cold Sweat" to a split single with Year Long Disaster in March, The Sword released its third studio album Warp Riders in August 2010, the music for which was credited to Cronise and Shutt. Second single "(The Night the Sky Cried) Tears of Fire" featured another previously unreleased track as a B-side, "Farstar". The band signed with Razor & Tie in 2012, and released the non-album single "Hammer of Heaven" in May that year, a song written by Cronise during the sessions for Age of Winters. The band's fourth album Apocryphon, the first to feature drummer Santiago "Jimmy" Vela III, followed in October and returned to crediting the music to the whole band.

Songs

Footnotes

References

External links
List of The Sword songs at AllMusic
The Sword official website

Sword, The